Khujin (also Romanized as Khūjīn and Khowjīn) is a village in Khanandabil-e Sharqi Rural District of the Central District of Khalkhal County, Ardabil province, Iran. At the 2006 census, its population was 2,720 in 773 households. The following census in 2011 counted 3,068 people in 871 households. The latest census in 2016 showed a population of 2,633 people in 799 households; it was the largest village in its rural district.

References 

Khalkhal County

Towns and villages in Khalkhal County

Populated places in Ardabil Province

Populated places in Khalkhal County